Tanais was an ancient Greek city in the Don river delta.

Tanais may also refer to:
Tanais River or Don River
Tanais, a Soviet coaster wrecked in October 1943
SS Tanais, a German requisitioned cargo vessel torpedoed by a RN submarine in June 1944
Tanais (crustacean), a genus of arthropods
12492 Tanais, a main belt asteroid
Tanaïs, author and perfumer formerly known as Tanwi Nandini Islam

See also
Tanai (disambiguation)